The Independence Day of Indonesia (in Indonesian formally known as Hari Ulang Tahun Kemerdekaan Republik Indonesia shortened "HUT RI", or simply Hari Kemerdekaan, and colloquially referred by the people as Tujuhbelasan, meaning "the Seventeenth") is a national holiday in Indonesia commemorating the anniversary of Indonesia's proclamation of independence on 17 August 1945. It was made a national holiday by government decree in 1946.

Ceremonies and festivities are held throughout the country to celebrate this national day, including the flag hoisting ceremony conducted nation-wide and at Indonesian diplomatic installations abroad, local community competitions, with patriotic and cultural parades. Discounts are offered by participating shopping centres or businesses. On 16 August or the last Friday prior to 17 August, the president of Indonesia addresses the nation at the People's Consultative Assembly.

On 17 August at 10:00 Western Indonesian Time all Indonesian national television networks traditionally broadcast the National Independence Day Ceremony live from the Merdeka Palace in Jakarta. Earlier that day, cities and regencies throughout Indonesia conduct the flag hoisting ceremony at their respective city halls. Streets, public places and public transportation are filled with nationalistic and patriotic decorations and art dominating with the red and white color symbolizing the national flag of Indonesia throughout the month of August.

The obligation to hoist the national flag
According to the Constitution of Indonesia Act Number 24 Year 2009 concerning the National Flag, National Language, State Symbols, and National Anthem Article 7 paragraph 3, it obliges every citizen of Indonesia to fly the national flag in front of their houses as well as on public institutions, office buildings, educational institutions, and on private and public transportation facilities throughout the country, as well as on Indonesian diplomatic offices abroad, on the 17 August. Nowadays, the government requests the public to fly the national flag for a whole month in August (starting from the 1st till the 31st) to commemorate the Proclamation of Indonesian Independence of the country. Many Indonesians did not know the obligation to raise the national flag, and local authorities gave flags to residents and businesses that did not raise the flag.

[[File:Jalan Silang Merdeka Tenggara umbul-umbul.JPG|thumb|left|Independence day pennant flags known locally as Umbul-umbul]]
In August, community members also raise red and white pennant flags (Umbul-umbul) and banners along streets and alleys and also decorate the community with shades of red and white as a representation of the colors of the national flag to celebrate and welcome the independence day, a custom which has been in practice for many years.

Flag hoisting ceremony

On the morning of 17 August, to commemorate Independence Day, the national Flag Hoisting Ceremony takes place at the Merdeka Palace in Jakarta hosted by the president of Indonesia accompanied by the vice-president to reenact the declaration of independence proclaimed by President Sukarno in 1945, held at 10.00 AM. It is broadcast nationwide by state and private television and radio stations, and is broadcast live on YouTube by the State Secretariat and a number of Indonesian television networks.

National level
The national independence day ceremony at Merdeka Palace was broadcast live nationally starting at 09.00 AM Western Indonesian Time. The ceremony is attended by distinguished guests from ambassadors and foreign defense attaches, former Indonesian presidents and vice-presidents, ministers and other government officials, prominent state figures, cultural figures including artists and celebrities, veterans, and other selected invitees from the general public.

The ceremony starts as the tri-services and police guard of honour enters the palace forecourt at about 9.30 AM to the tune of marching music from combined military band. The guard of honour is provided by headquarters battalion of the National Armed Forces, all composed of military policemen and women, and the HQ Detachment of the National Police. As the president and vice-president enter the palace, the Ceremony Commander, usually a colonel, leads the parade in the general salute to the president, followed by the remembrance of the proclamation of independence precisely at 10.00 AM accompanied by 17-gun salute fired from the National Monument (Monas) by the Indonesian Army 7th Field Artillery Battalion.
 
The core event of the ceremony takes place as the National Flag Hoisting Troop (composed of high school students who pass the selection processes, representing every province) marches into the main palace forecourt to raise the national flag by goose-stepping. As they enter the complex, the national flag is presented to the color company of students and personnel of the Presidential Security Force. Afterwards they march to the flagpole to raise the national flag accompanied by the playing of the national anthem Indonesia Raya. After the flag is raised, a fly-past is conducted by the Indonesian Air Force fighter aircraft right above the Merdeka Palace followed by joint services national flag flypast with helicopters of the Armed Forces and Police (introduced in the 2021 parade inspired by the Singapore National Day Parade), continued with orchestral and musical performance by Indonesian national orchestra the Gita Bahana Nusantara (under direction of Directorate of Films, Music, and Media Affairs) presenting Indonesian patriotic and traditional songs. The ceremony concluded by general salute to the president and the honour guards exit the palace forecourt at noon.

At 5 PM Western Indonesian Time, the National Flag Lowering Ceremony takes place at Merdeka Palace hosted by the president and vice-president of Indonesia. The ceremony is usually preceded by marching band, musical and traditional dance performances usually broadcasts live since 4 PM. The lowering of the flag is conducted by the second group of the National Flag Hoisting Troop and the national flag is given back to the president by the flag carrier.

Regional level

On 17 August, the national flag hoisting and lowering ceremonies are also conducted in every city and regency throughout the country with the local Mayor or Regent as the guest of honor (for the ceremony conducted at the city or regency level), and the provincial governor as the guest of honor (for the ceremony conducted at the provincial capital city level). The flag hoisting ceremony takes place earlier in the morning, which is at 7 AM local time for the regional level before the national level at Merdeka Palace in Jakarta commences. The flag-lowering ceremony is conducted at about 5 PM local time. Many of these regional ceremonies are also live streamed.

International level
On 17 August, Indonesian embassies and diplomatic offices around the world conduct the Flag Hoisting (in the morning) and the Flag Lowering Ceremony (at the afternoon) local time. After the flag hoisting ceremony, Indonesian embassies abroad usually also held some festivities, including cultural performances, music show, singing contests, competitions, and organising tent bazaar; selling Indonesian foods, handycrafts, souvenirs and various products. During this event, bazaar and festivities usually invites Indonesian expatriates and also foreign Indonesian culture enthusiasts.

Other independence day ceremonies
Other than the national and regional flag hoisting ceremonies conducted by the government, schools, private sectors, offices, corporations, and other organizations throughout the country also conducts the flag hoisting ceremony to commemorate the proclamation of Indonesian Independence. It is usually done a couple of days after 17 August while some organizations or institutions conduct it on 17 August.

Independence day festivities

Independence Day is regarded as an important public holiday in Indonesia, and to celebrate the proclamation of Indonesian Independence, it is filled with joyful community competitions organized by localities throughout the country (locally known as lomba tujuhbelasan meaning "independence day competitions"). After witnessing the National Flag Hoisting ceremony in the morning, in the afternoon people usually participate in such activities. Some areas organize these competitions a couple of days or weeks after 17 August, usually organizing it on a weekend. 

Traditional games and competitions usually held to commemorate independence day are:
 Krupuk-eating race, krupuks are hanged on a thread and competitors must race to eat them with their hands behind their backs.
 Panjat pinang, it is a famous independence day game usually conducted at villages or communities throughout the country. The game is done by using a greased pole and putting precious prizes on top, and participants must climb the pole to get the prizes.
 Community Marching, known locally as Gerak Jalan is done where participants wear unique uniforms and march in a synchronized manner. This is done to compete between members of a neighborhood and is usually participated by adults. 
 Bicycling carnival, known locally as Sepeda hias is participated by children riding their bicycles decorated in the Independence Day theme with red and white and the winner would be announced for the best decorated bicycle.    
 Marble in spoon race, usually for children. A marble is placed in a spoon that is held in the competitor's mouth. Competitors must balance the marble while walking along the line and race towards the finish line.
 Sack race
 Bottle fishing, a nail is tied with a thread that's tied on the waist and hanged from the competitor's behind. Competitors must place the nail bait into the bottle and try to pull or "fish" the bottle.
 Wooden clog race
 Musical chairs
 Tug of war
 Coin biting
 Pillow fight
 Hitting the kendi terracotta jar blindfolded, similar to a piñata
 Balloon bursting
 Balloon dance
 Orange dance
 Searching for coins in flour
 Inserting thread into needle race
 Colouring competition
 Flag race, usually for children. Several small flags are placed in a container in one side and an empty container is placed on the other side. Each kids must race to place these flags into the empty container one by one.
 Catching the eel race
 Sarong football or daster football, a football competition among men, made more difficult by wearing sarong or daster'' (woman casual home dress, usually worn by moms).

Various sports competitions are also held such as soccer, badminton, volleyball, table tennis, etc.

Independence day carnivals

On Independence Day, parades or carnivals take place on streets in cities and villages across the nation. They might take the form of a modest carnival, organized by local people, where children and sometimes adults wear patriotic clothes, or  traditional ethnic costumes. Some larger parades might be held and organized by provincial, regency, or municipal governments, staged in main thoroughfares of cities.

Some places may hold independence day carnivals not precisely on the 17 August, but usually on a Saturday or Sunday following the 17th. The parade and carnival usually feature marching bands, decorative floats, patriotic parades and cultural carnivals featuring traditional costumes of various ethnic groups of Indonesia. 
They usually start in Merdeka Square by the National Monument, parading through capital main avenues; Thamrin and Sudirman avenues, passing Selamat Datang Monument and the Gelora Bung Karno Sports Complex.

In recent years however, the main national carnival has not been staged in the national capital, but in provinces with regional cities taking turns hosting this national event. In 2017, for example, the national independence carnival was staged in Bandung, West Java.

Gallery
Festivities and activities celebrating the Independence Day of Indonesia:

Themes
Independence Day themes are announced by the central government to accompany the annual independence day which alternately changes every year.

See also

 Indonesian National Revolution
 Merdeka
 Hari Merdeka (Malaysia)

References

External links 
 Youtube: The Full Coverage of the National Independence Day Ceremony at Merdeka Palace Jakarta 2019
 Special Report – The 73rd Anniversary of the Proclamation of the Republic of Indonesia in 2018 on YouTube video
 Youtube: Independence Day Carnival at Bandung, West Java in 2017

August observances
Independence days
Public holidays in Indonesia
Festivals in Indonesia